In the Second Battle of Lutterberg (19 July 1762), the Franco-Saxon contingent under General the Comte de Lusace were defeated by Prince Ferdinand.

References

Lutterberg
Battles involving France
Battles of the Seven Years' War
Battles in Lower Saxony
1762 in the Holy Roman Empire